Ungheni may refer to:

 Ungheni, a city in the Republic of Moldova
 Ungheni district, a district in the Republic of Moldova
 Ungheni, Mureș, a city in Mureș County, Romania
 Ungheni, Argeș, a commune in Argeș County, Romania
 Ungheni, Iași, a commune in Iaşi County, Romania
 Ungheni, a village in Răucești Commune, Neamţ County, Romania